Salama Abū Hāshim or Salma Abu Hashim, was one of the companions of Muhammad.

Salama a village near Jaffa is reportedly named after him. Salameh Street, now on the border of Tel Aviv and Jaffa is consequently named after the historic village.

References 

Companions of the Prophet